Tastebuds is a dating and social networking website and iOS app that matches people based on their tastes in music.

Overview
Users can connect with Facebook, Spotify or Last.fm, or enter some of their favorite musical artists to be matched with people who share their musical preferences.

Tastebuds is integrated with popular events service Songkick allowing users to arrange to meet at concerts they're attending.

Messaging is free on the iPhone app, however, it is not free to new website users as of January 2014. Existing users can message anyone.

Tastebuds acquired one of its competitors, moosify in 2014, bringing along approximately 100,000 members with it.

On Thursday the 2nd of March 2023, Tastebuds announced to its online memembers "It is with a heavy heart that we share the news that Tastebuds will be shutting down on April 18th, 2023. Unfortunately, it is no longer viable to keep Tastebuds running. Supporting a service of this scale - while maintaining a high quality of user experience - is a huge technical and administrative undertaking which requires considerable resources. We have explored many different ways to keep the service going, but ultimately, it is no longer possible!"

See also
 List of online dating websites
 Online dating service

References

 Mashable.com, Friday 18, 2010 Mashable.com feature on Tastebuds.fm
 Guardian.co.uk, If music be the food of love Tastebuds.fm is on to a winner
 Glamour.com Glamour.com article on Tastebuds.fm
 Time.com Tastebuds.fm Finds Your Musical and Romantic Soulmate For You
 Consequence.net Finding Love Through Music: Online dating app Tastebuds.fm does just that
 MTV.com Is this Music Dating Site the new Tinder?

External links
 Tastebuds website
 Tastebuds iPhone app

Online dating services of the United States
Internet properties established in 2010
2010 establishments in the United States